U-43 may refer to one of the following German submarines:

 , the lead ship of the Type U 43 class of submarines; launched in 1914 and that served in the First World War until surrendered on 20 November 1918
 During the First World War, Germany also had these submarines with similar names:
 , a Type UB II submarine launched in 1916; transferred to Austria-Hungary and renamed U-43; surrendered on 6 November 1918
 , a Type UC II submarine launched in 1916 and sunk on 10 March 1917
 , a Type IX submarine that served in the Second World War until sunk on 30 July 1943

U-43 or U-XLIII may also refer to:
 , lead boat of the  submarines for the Austro-Hungarian Navy

Submarines of Germany